The Greenwater Range is a mountain range located in the eastern Mojave Desert in Inyo County, California. They are located west of the section of California State Route 127 north of  Shoshone, California.

Geography
The mountains lie a short distance to the east of the Black Mountains, and south of the Amargosa Range, and northwest of the Nopah Range.  Ryan, California is in the northern section, and the southern part of the range is within Death Valley National Park.

Death Valley Junction, home of the Amargosa Opera House and Hotel, and the Amargosa River are to the east of the Greenwater Range.

References

Death Valley
Mountain ranges of the Mojave Desert
Mountain ranges of Inyo County, California